Collonges-et-Premières is a commune in the Côte-d'Or department in eastern France. It is the result of the merger, on 28 February 2019, of the communes of Collonges-lès-Premières and Premières. Collonges station has rail connections to Dijon, Dole and Besançon.

Population

See also
Communes of the Côte-d'Or department

References

Communes of Côte-d'Or
Populated places established in 2019
2019 establishments in France